Dragoș Sebastian Tescan (born 15 September 1999) is a Romanian professional footballer who plays as a midfielder for Liga I club Universitatea Cluj.

References

External links
 
 

1999 births
Living people
Sportspeople from Craiova
Romanian footballers
Association football midfielders
Liga I players
FC UTA Arad players
Liga II players
AFC Turris-Oltul Turnu Măgurele players
FC Universitatea Cluj players